The 1970 24 Hours of Daytona was an endurance race at the 3.8 mile road circuit at the Daytona International Speedway, Daytona Beach, Florida, USA that took place on January 31 and February 1, 1970. It was the first race of the 1970 World Sportscar Championship season. This was the first race for the iconic Porsche 917K and Ferrari 512 S cars.

Race
Ex-Aston Martin race team manager John Wyer's Gulf-sponsored team finished 1-2 in the race and broke the distance record by 190 miles; with the #28 works Ferrari finishing 3rd. It was the first race in which the now iconic Porsche 917K appeared, and this event effectively began the 917's domination of the WSC for the next 2 seasons.

Official results

Did not finish

Did not start

Statistics
 Pole Position - #28 SpA Ferrari SEFAC Ferrari 512 S (Mario Andretti/Arturo Merzario)- 1:51.6 (122.903 mph/197.794 km/h)
 Fastest Lap - #1 John Wyer Automotive Porsche 917K (Jo Siffert) - 1:48.7 (126.159 mph/203.033 km/h)
 Distance - 4439.279 km  (2735.974 mi)
 Average Speed - 184,859 km/h (115 mph)
 Weather conditions: Sunny

References

24 Hours of Daytona
24 Hours of Daytona
24 Hours of Daytona
24 Hours of Daytona